Evan Oliphant (born 8 January 1982) is a Scottish bicycle racer from Wick, Caithness, who currently rides for British amateur team Spartans Velo Club.

He competed in the Under-23 road race at the 2004 UCI Road World Championships in Verona, Italy. Oliphant represented Scotland on the track and in the 2006 Commonwealth Games in Melbourne on the road.

Major results

2005
 1st Road race, Scottish National Road Championships
 1st Warrnambool Criterium
 1st East Yorkshire Classic
 3rd 5 Valleys Road Race
 5th Shay Elliott Memorial Race
2006
 1st Overall Bay Crit Elite Criterium Series
 1st Kym Smoker Memorial Track Race
 3rd Road race, Scottish National Road Championships
 3rd Overall Tour Wellington
1st Stage 4
 4th Points race, Commonwealth Games
 6th Bendigo Madison (with James McCallum)
2007
 1st Road race, Scottish National Road Championships
2008
 1st Road race, Scottish National Road Championships
 1st Sea Otter Classic
 2nd Overall Bikeline 2 Day
1st Stage 2
 6th Overall Girvan Stage Race
 6th Overall Tour of the Reservoir
 7th Grand Prix of Wales
 7th NRC Circuit Race
 10th Richmond Grand Prix
2009
 6th Tour of the Reservoir
 8th Beaumont Trophy
2010
 1st Road race, Scottish National Road Championships
 Dumfries Bike Fest
4th Circuit race
6th Grand Prix
 6th York Cycling City Centre Race
 10th Tour of the Reservoir
2011
 2nd Ryedale Grand Prix
2012
 2nd Road race, Scottish National Road Championships
2013
 1st Overall Premier Calendar
 1st Overall Tour of the Reservoir
1st Stage 2
 1st Hugh Dornan Memorial
2014
 1st Road race, Scottish National Road Championships
 6th Beaumont Trophy
 6th Eddie Soens Memorial
 7th Newport Nocturne
 10th Overall Tour of the Reservoir
1st Stage 2
 10th Cycle Wiltshire Grand Prix
 10th Lincoln Grand Prix
 10th Jersey International Road Race
2015
 1st Overall British Cycling Grand Prix Series
5th Grand Prix of Wales
10th Stafford Kermesse
 1st Crit on the Campus
 5th Stockton Grand Prix
 5th Hugh Dornan Memorial
 7th Stafford GP
 8th National Circuit Race Championships
 8th Colne Grand Prix
 9th Overall Totnes-Vire Stage Race

References

External links

1982 births
Living people
Commonwealth Games competitors for Scotland
Cyclists at the 2006 Commonwealth Games
People from Wick, Caithness
Scottish male cyclists
Cyclists at the 2010 Commonwealth Games
Sportspeople from Highland (council area)
Cyclists at the 2014 Commonwealth Games